The following is a list of managers of Coventry City Football Club and their major honours from the beginning of the club's official managerial records in 1883 to the present day.

The most successful person to manage Coventry City, to date, is Jimmy Hill, who guided The Sky Blues to become champions of Second Division and Third Division. The club's longest-serving manager is Harry Storer, who had two spells managing the club from 1931 to 1945 and from 1948 to 1953, totalling 19 years and 1 month.

Statistics
Information correct as of match played 8 March 2023.
Only competitive matches are counted.
Caretaker managers are not included in this list.

Records

Most games managed
Information correct as of match played 7 May 2022.

Highest win percentages
Information correct as of match played 7 May 2022.

Nationalities
As of December 2016.

Notes

External links
 at Coventry City Official Site

 
Managers
Coventry City